{{DISPLAYTITLE:C2H6N4O2}}
The molecular formula C2H6N4O2 (molar mass: 118.09 g/mol, exact mass: 118.0491 u) may refer to:

 Biurea
 Oxalyldihydrazide